The Order of the Lion was, at one point, the highest state order, and the second highest honour bestowed by the government of Malawi.

History

The order was established by President Hastings Kamuzu Banda in 1967. It was the second highest honour to be bestowed by the government of the Republic of Malawi under Hastings Banda's presidential dictatorship (1966-94). The order consisted of five classes plus a medal, to be awarded "For distinguished and outstanding services to the people of Malawi".

Banda announced the creation of the order, as well as a number of other new awards, in July 1966, as Malawi was declared a republic. The announcement was given at Zomba, the capital of Malawi at the time.

Malawian civilians and military personnel, as well as foreigners, were all eligible for award of the order. However, in 2008, after deliberations that had lasted for three years, the Malawian government decided to deactivate the Order of the Lion, although appointees to the order were still allowed to wear the insignia of their grade.

Description

The ribbon of the order is red, with two golden stripes running down each side. The Medal of the Order of the Lion is a cross, with a central medallion featuring an image of a lion's face, encircled by a red banner on which the Malawian motto, "Unity and Freedom." is written. The medals of higher grades of the order feature the same medallion, superimposed onto a green enameled cross. The grades of Grand Commander and Grand Officer also receive a badge, again featuring the lion medallion, superimposed onto stars.  The Grand Commander's badge features twelve rays extending between the points of a twelve-pointed star, and the Grand Officer's badge features a ten-pointed star with points alternating in length, and is itself superimposed on an inverted pentagon.

Notable recipients

Akihito
Cecilia Kadzamira
Charles III
Chiang Kai-shek
Elizabeth II
Franz Josef Strauss
Haile Selassie
Leonard Massey
Nelson Mandela

References

Orders, decorations, and medals of Malawi
Awards established in 1967
1967 establishments in Malawi
Awards disestablished in 2008